Mark Lindsay (born March 9, 1942) is an American musician, best known as the lead singer of Paul Revere & the Raiders.

Early life 
Lindsay was born in Eugene, Oregon, and was the second of eight children of George and Esther Ellis Lindsay.  The family moved to Idaho when he was young, where he attended Wilder High School.

Career
Lindsay began performing at age 15 with local bands that played local venues. He was tapped to sing in a band, Freddy Chapman and the Idaho Playboys, after he won a local talent contest. After Chapman left the area, Lindsay saw the other band members and a new member, Paul Revere Dick, playing at a local I.O.O.F. Hall. He persuaded the band to allow him to sing a few songs with them. The next day, he was working at McClure Bakery in Caldwell, Idaho, when Paul Revere came in to buy supplies for a hamburger restaurant that he owned.  This chance meeting began their professional relationship.

The Downbeats
Lindsay became lead singer and saxophone player in a band with Revere and several others. He suggested they call themselves "The Downbeats" after a magazine with the same title. They made some demo tapes in 1960 in Boise, Idaho, and signed with a record company called Gardena Records. The group scored their first national hit with the piano/guitar instrumental "Like, Long Hair" which peaked at No. 38 in the Billboard charts on April 17, 1961.

After changing personnel a few more times, the band recorded the song "Louie, Louie" about the same time that a rival Pacific Northwest band, The Kingsmen, recorded the song.  The Kingsmen version was the one that charted nationally, but Mark and his bandmates also were gaining attention.

Paul Revere & the Raiders
Around the time "Louie, Louie" was recorded, they decided to use Paul Revere's name as a gimmick and bill themselves as "Paul Revere & the Raiders". They began to dress in Revolutionary War-style outfits. Mark Lindsay carried the theme a bit further by growing his hair out and pulling it back into a ponytail, which became his signature look.

Lindsay and the group caught the attention of Dick Clark, who was developing Where the Action Is, an afternoon show  for the teen market. Clark hired the group as regular performers, and the group soon became very successful.  Lindsay's lanky stature and good looks, as well as his excellent singing voice, quickly gained him immense popularity; he became one of the premier American teen idols of the 1960s.

Lindsay soon started working not only as the singer of the group, but also as a composer and producer.  The Raiders were the first rock group signed by Columbia Records and were produced by Terry Melcher, the son of actress and singer Doris Day.  Lindsay and Melcher became friends and shared a house for a while.  The house later became infamous as the site of the horrific murders of actress Sharon Tate and others, committed by members of Charles Manson's "family."

Television

By 1968 Lindsay had completely taken over the writing and producing tasks for the group. Paul Revere & the Raiders had a revolving cast of band members, with only Revere and Lindsay remaining in the group since its inception. Where the Action Is had passed into television history. Dick Clark had created another show, Happening '68, which was to be hosted by Revere and Lindsay, and was to feature the group. The group itself was featured prominently in this show, whereas in Where the Action Is, the entire group was part of an ensemble of other musical performers. Happening '68 premiered in January 1968. The show was so popular that the group also hosted a daily version over the summer of 1968, called It's Happening.  Happening '68 survived into 1969, at which point the name of the show became Happening. The show was canceled in October 1969.

By this time, like many other groups, Mark Lindsay and his bandmates were trying to maintain their success, but also were exploring other opportunities. Lindsay began to record solo records and to produce records for his bandmate, Freddy Weller, who went on to have his own solo success in the country music genre.

Lindsay had some success with such songs as "Arizona" (1969, Billboard #10), which sold over one million copies and was awarded a gold disc; and "Silver Bird" (Billboard #25) in 1970.

Lindsay recorded "Indian Reservation", a song written by John Loudermilk and made into a Hot 100 top 20 hit by Don Fardon years earlier.  It was intended to be a solo recording for Lindsay, but for marketing purposes, the decision was made to release the song under the simple band name of "Raiders" with just Lindsay & Revere appearing on the track along with L.A. session players from the Wrecking Crew, and the song was retitled with a subtitle, "Indian Reservation (The Lament of the Cherokee Reservation Indian)".  On the Hot 100, the record reached No. 1, whereas the highest position that Paul Revere & the Raiders had ever reached was No. 4.

Lindsay continued to chart solo singles throughout 1970-71:  "Miss America" (#44 - May 1970), "And the Grass Won't Pay No Mind" (#44 - November 1970), "Problem Child" (#80 - January 1971), "Been Too Long on the Road" (#98 - June 1971) and "Are You Old Enough" (#87 - October 1971).  Lindsay kept his profile up by appearing on The Carpenters television variety show Make Your Own Kind of Music, as well as singing the themes to films Something Big (1971) and "Jody", the theme from Santee (1973 - credited to The Raiders).

By the mid-seventies the group no longer sold as many records as they once had, and both Lindsay and the Raiders lost their Columbia contract.  Lindsay officially left the group in 1975 when he and Paul Revere apparently had different visions for the group and their own individual pursuits.  He did make a few more appearances in 1976 for some Bicentennial performances as well as a Dick Clark produced reunion with his Action era bandmates in 1977.

After the Raiders
According to a Rolling Stone interview (conducted in 1985), Lindsay left The Raiders because "there was a contractual thing I didn't agree with, and I just stopped."

Lindsay continued to record solo singles for a few years (for Warner Bros., Elka and Greedy Records) before retiring from performing to serve as head of A&R for United Artists Records. He contributed to the recordings of artists such as Gerry Rafferty (on "Baker Street"), Kenny Rogers, and others.  His accomplishments also included composing jingles for commercials (including Baskin-Robbins, Datsun, Kodak, Pontiac, and Levi's) and scores for motion pictures. He contributed both his voice and his musical compositions to advertisements for companies such as Yamaha, which used the music from "Silver Bird" as the background to one of its commercials. He also composed music for the movies For Pete's Sake and The Love Machine, sung by Barbra Streisand and Dionne Warwick, respectively, and for a 1982 documentary, The Killing of America, as well as a song for the movie Savage Streets.  In 1980 he dubbed a voice and co-wrote the musical score (with W. Michael Lewis) for the American version of the Japanese movie Shogun Assassin.

Lindsay made some appearances in 1985 in conjunction with the centennial of the Statue of Liberty, the Legends for Liberty tour (backed by the sixties rock band Spirit), and began to tour on his own again. In 1989 he quietly began recording at Kiva Studios (now House of Blues Studios of Memphis) in Memphis, Tennessee with friend Michael Bradley. Although the album Looking for Shelter was not picked up for national release, Lindsay made the album available for fans through his website in 2003. In the early nineties he met the group, The Chesterfield Kings in Rochester, New York, on one of his tours, and later collaborated with them, performing on their recording of "Where Do We Go From Here?" He also appeared in a cameo in their film, Where is the Chesterfield King? (2000).

Lindsay's next official solo release was Video Dreams in 1996. This effort was warmly received and Lindsay began an even more aggressive touring schedule.  Video Dreams had originally started as a duet album with Carla Olson.  Lindsay previously dueted with Olson on "Ups and Downs", included on her 1994 album Reap The Whirlwind. Olson co-produced the original sessions with Lindsay and brought in Danny Federici and Eric Johnson, as well as songs written by two friends of hers, Scott Kempner of the Del Lords and Michael Nold. A disagreement about the album's direction led to the album becoming a solo album by Lindsay, though the song selection remained the same, with only one song added that had not originally been recorded with Olson.

He followed this release with a holiday record (Twas the Night Before Christmas (2000)) and Live at Rick's Cafe (1999) (not a live album, but a collection of pre-rock standards).

In 2003 he had announced he would retire from touring, but he later reconsidered. A recording of his first "farewell" show was released in 2004 (The Last Midnight Ride). He currently does some touring, but as of January 7, 2006, he was heard on a webcast every Saturday night on the website of KISN radio from 7 p.m. to 12 a.m. PST, titled "Mark After Dark."

On November 11, 2006, "Mark After Dark" switched to FM webcast "K-Hits 106-7" KLTH Saturday nights 7 p.m. to 11 p.m. PST. On March 10, 2007, the program "Mark After Dark" changed its name to "Mark Lindsay's Rock & Roll Cafe" to refer to Lindsay's restaurant, which opened to the public in Portland, Oregon, on August 27, 2007. The restaurant included a remote studio where Lindsay did his radio show in front of restaurant guests and can be seen from the street and sidewalk. The studio was also used at times by other K-Hits air personalities.

On September 21, 2007, a federal lawsuit was filed against the new restaurant for the restaurant's allegedly unauthorized use of various trademarks owned by the Yaw family, who had operated Yaw's Top Notch Restaurants in the Portland area for many years. On May 12, 2008, "Mark Lindsay's Rock & Roll Cafe" announced its closure.

Lindsay's recording of Treat Her Right with Los Straitjackets in 2001 was cited by Stephen King in his column for Entertainment Weekly in May 2008. "This remake of Roy Head's 1965 soul hit smokes. And Mark Lindsay sounds so good you just gotta wonder where he was all those years."

During the summers of 2010–2013, Lindsay had a heavy touring schedule throughout the U.S. as part of the Happy Together:  25th Anniversary Tour, along with Flo & Eddie of The Turtles, The Grass Roots, The Buckinghams, and 'Monkees' member Micky Dolenz (2010 and 2013 only). In 2013, Lindsay recorded an album of new material on the Bongo Boy Records label entitled, "Life Out Loud." Lindsay was on the national tour of the "Happy Together" tours of 2015, 2016, and 2018, and will be on the upcoming "Happy Together" tour of 2020. In 2022, “Silver Bird” figures prominently in the Netflix movie The Gray Man starring Ryan Gosling.

Personal life
Lindsay married his second wife, Deborah (née Brandt), on July 29, 1989, in McCall, Idaho after his first marriage to Jaime Zygon ended in the early 1980s. He now resides in Maine downeast near Machias.

Discography

Albums
 Arizona (Columbia) 1969, US 36
 Silverbird (Columbia) 1970, US 82
 You've Got A Friend (Columbia) 1971, US 180
 Shogun Assassin (soundtrack) (w/ Michael Lewis)(import) 1980
 The Best of Mark Lindsay (Columbia) 1984
 Looking for Shelter (marklindsaysounds.com) 1989; 2003
 Video Dreams (alala music) 1996 This album was originally a duet project with Carla Olson. Rumors of an eventual release of the Carla / Mark version of the album known as Revenge continue.
 Live at Rick's Cafe (alala music) 1999
 Twas the Night Before Christmas (alala music) 2000
 The Last Midnight Ride (marklindsaysounds.com) 2004
 Mark Lindsay: The Complete Columbia Singles (Real Gone Music) 2012
 Like Nothing That You've Seen - Single (Bongo Boy Records) 2013
 Show Me The Love - Single (Bongo Boy Records) 2013
 Life Out Loud (Bongo Boy Records) 2013

Singles
 "First Hymn from Grand Terrace" (Columbia) 1969, US BB 81, US AC 24
 "Arizona" (Columbia) 1969, US BB 10, US AC 16, RIAA Gold
 "Miss America (Columbia) 1970, US BB 44, US AC 20
 "Silver Bird" (Columbia) 1970, US BB 25, US AC 7
 "And the Grass Won't Pay No Mind" (Columbia) 1970, US BB 44, US AC 5; Canada RPM 34, AC 14
 "Problem Child" (Columbia) 1971, US BB 80, US AC 35
 "Been Too Long on the Road" (Columbia) 1971, US BB 98
 "Are You Old Enough" (Columbia) 1971, US BB 87
 "Something Big" (Columbia) 1972, US AC 36
 "Photograph" (Columbia) 1975, US RW 113
 "Sing Your Own Song" (Greedy) 1976, US CB 103, US AC 22

Production credits
Singles
 "Tighter"/"Young Enough to Cry" (1967), Marlin - The Unknowns, single
 "Birds of a Feather"/"To Know Her is to Love Her" (1969), Columbia Records - single/Keith Allison
 "First Hymn from Grand Terrace" (1969), Columbia Records
 "Everybody"/"Wednesday's Child" (1969), Columbia Records - single/Keith Allison
 "Arizona" (1970), Columbia Records
 "Miss America"/"Small Town Woman" (1970), Columbia Records
 "Silver Bird" (1970), Columbia Records
 "And the Grass Won't Pay No Mind" (1970), Columbia Records
 "Song Seller"/"A Simple Song" (1972), Columbia Records - The Raiders, single
 "Love Music"/"Goodbye No. 9" (1973), Columbia Records - The Raiders, single
 "(If I Had it to Do All Over Again, I'd Do It) All Over You"/"Seaboard Line Boogie" (1974), CBS - The Raiders
 "Sing Your Own Song" (1976), Greedy - Mark Lindsay, single w/Perry Botkin, Jr.
 "Oklahoma"/"Oklahoma" (1977), Capitol Records - w/Terry Melcher
 "Sing Me High (Sing Me Low)"/"Flips-Eyed" (1977), Warner Bros. - Mark Lindsay, single
 "Little Ladies of the Night"/"Flips-Eyed" (1977), Warner Bros. Records - Mark Lindsay, single
 "Tobacco Road" (1977), United Artists - Ritchie Lecea, exec. producer, single
 "Theme from Mork and Mindy"/"Disco Kicks" (1979), Ariola - Cake, w/Perry Botkin, Jr., single
 "Disco Kicks" (1981), J & D - The Original Mass, w/Perry Botkin, Jr., 12-inch single

Albums
 Something Happening (1968), Columbia Records - Paul Revere & the Raiders
 Hard and Heavy (With Marshmallow) (1969), Columbia Records - /Paul Revere & the Raiders
 Alias Pink Puzz (1969), Columbia Records - Paul Revere & the Raiders
 Games People Play (1969), Columbia Records - Freddy Weller
 Listen to the Young Folks (1970), Columbia Records - Freddy Weller, 3 tracks
 Collage (1970), Columbia Records - The Raiders
 Indian Reservation (1971), Columbia Records - The Raiders
 You've Got a Friend (1971), Columbia Records - Mark Lindsay, all but two tracks
 Country Wine (1972), Columbia Records - The Raiders
 Boy from New York City (1979), United Artists - Michael Christian, w/Perry Botkin, Jr.
 Lifeline (1979), United Artists - Paul Balfour, w/Perry Botkin, Jr.
 Shogun Assassin Soundtrack (1980), Toshiba - Wonderland Philharmonic
 unreleased Paul Revere & the Raiders album w/vocalist Michael Bradley (1982)
 Looking for Shelter (1990), marklindsaysounds.com - Mark Lindsay, w/Michael Bradley
 Video Dreams (1996), alala - Mark Lindsay
 Live at Rick's Cafe (1999), alala - Mark Lindsay, w/W. Michael Lewis
 Twas the Night Before Christmas (2000), marklindsaysounds.com - Mark Lindsay, w/W. Michael Lewis
 The Last Midnight Ride (2004), marklindsaysounds.com - Mark Lindsay

FilmographyShogun Assassin (1980)The Killing of America'' (1982)

References

External links
 Mark Lindsay's MySpace Page
 Official Website

1942 births
Living people
Musicians from Eugene, Oregon
Musicians from Portland, Oregon
American rock singers
American rock songwriters
American male singer-songwriters
People from Wilder, Idaho
American male saxophonists
American multi-instrumentalists
Singer-songwriters from Oregon
21st-century American saxophonists
21st-century American male musicians
Singer-songwriters from Idaho
Paul Revere & the Raiders members